Triennial elections for all 74 cities, districts, twelve regional councils and all district health boards in New Zealand were held on 9 October 2004. Most councils were elected using the first-past-the-post method, but ten (of which Wellington City was the largest) were elected using the single transferable vote (STV) method. It was the first time that the STV method was available; the change came through successful lobbying by Rod Donald.

District health board elections
Elections for the 21 district health boards (DHBs) were first held alongside the 2001 local elections. The government had hoped to use the STV voting method from the start but this could not be achieved and in 2001, first-past-the-post voting (FPP) was used based on local wards. For the 2004 elections, the STV method was used. From 2004 onwards, DHB candidates have been elected at large (i.e. across the whole voting area).

STV voting method
Apart from the district health boards, ten district or city councils used the STV method for the 2004 local elections: Kaipara, Papakura, Matamata-Piako, Thames-Coromandel, Kapiti Coast, Porirua, Wellington, Marlborough, Dunedin, and the Chatham Islands.

A private company, elections.com and its subsidiary Datamail, had been engaged by seven councils, eighteen DHBs, and one licensing trust with operating the STV elections. During the weekend of the elections, it was discovered that when voting papers were transferred to computer-readable data, not all data were correctly recorded. The Office of the Auditor-General became involved and tasked with confirming the election results. The final results for these elections became available in early November, nearly one month after the local election. The government initiated a select committee inquiry.

Overview and list of elected mayors

North Island

 Bay of Plenty Regional Council (Environment BOP)
 Western Bay of Plenty District Council
 Tauranga City Council
 Opotiki District Council
 Whakatane District Council
 Rotorua District Council (part)
 Kawerau District Council
 Taupo District Council (part)
 Gisborne District Council (unitary authority)
 Hawke's Bay Regional Council
 Wairoa District Council
 Taupo District Council (part)
 Hastings District Council
 Napier City Council
 Central Hawke's Bay District Council
 Rangitikei District Council (part)
 Taranaki Regional Council
 New Plymouth District Council
 Stratford District Council (part)
 South Taranaki District Council
 Manawatū-Whanganui Regional Council (Horizons Regional Council; horizons.mw)
 Ruapehu District Council
 Stratford District Council (part)
 Rangitikei District Council (part)
 Wanganui District Council
 Manawatu District Council
 Palmerston North City Council
 Tararua District Council
 Horowhenua District Council
 Wellington Regional Council (Greater Wellington Regional Council; Greater Wellington—The Regional Council)
 Masterton District Council
 Kapiti Coast District Council
 Carterton District Council
 South Wairarapa District Council
 Upper Hutt City Council
 Porirua City Council
 Hutt City Council *
 Wellington City Council

South Island
 Tasman District Council (unitary authority)
 Nelson City Council (unitary authority)
 Marlborough District Council (unitary authority)
 West Coast Regional Council
 Buller District Council
 Grey District Council
 Westland District Council
 Canterbury Regional Council (Environment Canterbury)
 Kaikoura District Council
 Hurunui District Council
 Selwyn District Council
 Waimakariri District Council
 Christchurch City Council
 Banks Peninsula District Council
 Ashburton District Council
 Mackenzie District Council
 Timaru District Council
 Waitaki District Council (part)
 Waimate District Council
 Otago Regional Council
 Queenstown Lakes District Council
 Central Otago District Council
 Waitaki District Council (part)
 Dunedin City Council Dunedin Mayoralty Election, 2004
 Clutha District Council
 Southland Regional Council (Environment Southland)
 Southland District Council
 Gore District Council
 Invercargill City Council

Stewart Island / Rakiura
 Southland Regional Council (Environment Southland)
 Southland District Council

Chatham Islands
 Chatham Islands Council (territory)

See also
2004 Wellington local elections

References

Local 2004
Local elections
October 2004 events in New Zealand